Polkorridoren (meaning "Polar Corridor" in Danish), formerly known as Nordpassagen, is a mountain pass in Peary Land, Greenland. Administratively it is part of the Northeast Greenland National Park.

In 1953 a geological expedition went through the Polkorridoren pass crossing the Roosevelt Range from south to north. The Polkorridoren Group is a geological formation named after the pass.

Geography
The pass is located in the central / western sector of the Roosevelt Range, east of Gertrud Rask Land. It runs from north to south between the glacial valley of Sands Fjord to the north and the valley of Frigg Fjord to the south. Helvetia Tinde rises to the west.

See also
Nordpasset
Sirius Passet

References

External links
A geochronological and petrological study of a Cretaceous mafic dyke swarm, Peary Land, North Greenland
Stratigraphy and depositional history of the Upper Palaeozoic and Triassic sediments in the Wandel Sea Basin, central and eastern North Greenland

Landforms of Greenland
Peary Land